Mulki may refer to:

Mulki, Armenia,a village
Mulki, Karnataka, a town in India

The native inhabitants of erstwhile Hyderabad State
1952 Mulkhi Agitation (Telangana)
a local name of the Thali dialect of Pakistan

See also
Mulkey (disambiguation)